Brienomyrus is a genus of small elephantfish in the family Mormyridae from Africa. Usually available in the pet trade, these fish are commercially referred to as baby whales or baby whalefish.

Species
There are currently three recognized species in this genus:

 Brienomyrus adustus (Fowler 1936)
 Brienomyrus brachyistius (T. N. Gill 1862) (whale African black reg)
 Brienomyrus longianalis (Boulenger 1901) (Niger delta elephantfish)

References 

Weakly electric fish
Mormyridae
Ray-finned fish genera